The national flag of Denmark is red with a white Nordic cross, which means that the cross extends to the edges of the flag and the vertical part of the cross is shifted to the hoist side.

A banner with a white-on-red cross is attested as having been used by the kings of Denmark since the 14th century. An origin legend with considerable impact on Danish national historiography connects the introduction of the flag to the Battle of Lindanise of 1219. 
The elongated Nordic cross reflects its use as a maritime flag in the 18th century. The flag became popular as a national flag in the early 16th century. Its private use was outlawed in 1834 but again permitted by a regulation of 1854. The flag holds the world record of being the oldest continuously used national flag.

Description

This regulation is still in effect today and thus the legal proportions of the National flag today are 3:1:3 in width and anywhere between 3:1:4.5 and 3:1:5.25 in length.

No official definition of "Dannebrog rød" exists. The private company Dansk Standard, regulation number 359 (2005), defines the red colour of the flag as Pantone 186c.

History

1219 origin legend 

A tradition recorded in the 16th century traces the origin of the flag to the campaigns of Valdemar II of Denmark (r. 1202–1241). The oldest of them is in Christiern Pedersen's "Danske Krønike", which is a sequel to Saxo's Gesta Danorum, written 1520–23. Here, the flag falls from the sky during one of Valdemar's military campaigns overseas. Pedersen also states that the very same flag was taken into exile by Eric of Pomerania in 1440.

The second source is the writing of the Franciscan friar Petrus Olai (Peder Olsen) of Roskilde (died c. 1570). This record describes a battle in 1208 near Fellin during the Estonia campaign of King Valdemar II. The Danes were all but defeated when a lamb-skin banner depicting a white cross fell from the sky and miraculously led to a Danish victory. In a third account, also by Petrus Olai, in Danmarks Tolv Herligheder ("Twelve Splendours of Denmark"), in splendour number nine, the same story is re-told almost verbatim, with a paragraph inserted correcting the year to 1219. Now, the flag is falling from the sky in the Battle of Lindanise, also known as the Battle of Valdemar (Danish: Volmerslaget), near Lindanise (Tallinn) in Estonia, of 15 June 1219.

It is this third account that has been the most influential, and some historians have treated it as the primary account taken from a (lost) source dating to the first half of the 15th century.

In Olai's account, the battle was going badly, and defeat seemed imminent. However the Danish Bishop Anders Sunesen, on top of a hill overlooking the battle, prayed to God with his arms raised, and the Danes moved closer to victory the more he prayed. When he raised his arms the Danes surged forward but when his arms grew tired and he let them fall, the Estonians turned the Danes back. Attendants rushed forward to raise his arms once again and the Danes again surged forward. But for a second time he grew so tired that he dropped his arms and the Danes again lost the advantage and were moving closer to defeat. He needed two soldiers to keep his hands up. When the Danes were about to lose, 'Dannebrog' miraculously fell from the sky and the King took it, showed it to the troops, their hearts were filled with courage, and the Danes won the battle.

The possible historical nucleus behind this origin legend was extensively discussed by Danish historians in the 19th to 20th centuries. One such example is Adolf Ditlev Jørgensen, who argued that Bishop Theoderich was the original instigator of the 1218 inquiry from Bishop Albert of Buxhoeveden to King Valdemar II which led to the Danish participation in the Baltic crusades. Jørgensen speculates that Bishop Theoderich might have carried the Knight Hospitaller's banner in the 1219 battle and that "the enemy thought this was the King's symbol and mistakenly stormed Bishop Theoderich tent. He claims that the origin of the legend of the falling flag comes from this confusion in the battle."

The Danish church-historian L. P. Fabricius (1934) ascribes the origin to the 1208 Battle of Fellin, not the Battle of Lindanise in 1219, based on the earliest source available about the story. Fabricius speculated that it might have been Archbishop Andreas Sunesøn's personal ecclesiastical banner or perhaps even the flag of Archbishop Absalon, under whose initiative and supervision several smaller crusades had already been conducted in Estonia. The banner would then already be known in Estonia. Fabricius repeats Jørgensen's idea about the flag being planted in front of Bishop Theodorik's tent, which the enemy mistakenly attacked believing it to be the tent of the King.

A different theory is briefly discussed by Fabricius and elaborated more by Helge Bruhn (1949). Bruhn interprets the story in the context of the widespread tradition of the miraculous appearance of crosses in the sky in Christian legend, specifically comparing such an event attributed to a battle of 10 September 1217 near Alcazar, where it is said that a golden cross on white appeared in the sky, to bring victory to the Christians.

In Swedish national historiography of the 18th century, there is a tale paralleling the Danish legend, in which 
a golden cross appears in the blue sky during a Swedish battle in Finland in 1157.

Middle Ages 

The white-on-red cross emblem originates in the age of the Crusades. In the 12th century, it was also used as war flag by the Holy Roman Empire.

In the Gelre Armorial, dated  1340–1370, such a banner is shown alongside the coat of arms of the king of Denmark. This is the earliest known undisputed colour rendering of the Dannebrog. At about the same time, Valdemar IV of Denmark displays a cross in his coat of arms on his Danælog seal (Rettertingsseglet, dated 1356). The image from the Armorial Gelre is nearly identical to an image found in a 15th-century coat of arms book now located in the National Archives of Sweden (Riksarkivet). The seal of Eric of Pomerania (1398) as king of the Kalmar union displays the arms of Denmark's chief dexter, three lions. In this version, the lions are holding a Dannebrog banner.

The reason why the kings of Denmark in the 14th century begin displaying the cross banner in their coats of arms is unknown. Caspar Paludan-Müller (1873) suggested that it may reflect a banner sent by the pope to support the Danish king during the Livonian Crusade. Adolf Ditlev Jørgensen (1875) identifies the banner as that of the Knights Hospitaller, which order had a presence in Denmark from the later 12th century.

Several coins, seals, and images exist, both foreign and domestic, from the 13th to 15th centuries and even earlier, showing heraldic designs similar to Dannebrog, alongside the royal coat of arms (three blue lions on a golden shield.)

There is a record suggesting that the Danish army had a "chief banner" (hoffuitbanner) in the early 16th century. Such a banner is mentioned in 1570 by Niels Hemmingsøn in the context of a 1520 battle between Danes and Swedes near Uppsala as nearly captured by the Swedes but saved by the heroic actions of the banner-carrier Mogens Gyldenstierne and Peder Skram. The legend attributing the miraculous origin of the flag to the campaigns of Valdemar II of Denmark (r. 1202–1241) was recorded by Christiern Pedersen and Petrus Olai in the 1520s.

Hans Svaning's History of King Hans from 1558 to 1559 and Johan Rantzau's History about the Last Dithmarschen War, from 1569, record the further fate of the Danish hoffuitbanner: According to this tradition, the original flag from the Battle of Lindanise was used in the small campaign of 1500 when King Hans tried to conquer Dithmarschen (in western Holstein in the north Germany). The flag was lost in a devastating defeat at the Battle of Hemmingstedt on 17 February 1500. In 1559, King Frederik II recaptured it during his own Dithmarschen campaign.

In 1576, the son of Johan Rantzau, Henrik Rantzau, also writes about the war and the fate of the flag, noting that the flag was in a poor condition when returned. He records that the flag after its return to Denmark was placed in the cathedral in Slesvig. Slesvig historian Ulrik Petersen (1656–1735) confirms the presence of such a banner in the cathedral in the early 17th century and records that it had crumbled away by about 1660.

Contemporary records describing the battle of Hemmingstedt make no reference to the loss of the original Dannebrog, although the capitulation state that all Danish banners lost in 1500 was to be returned. In a letter dated 22 February 1500 to Oluf Stigsøn, King John describes the battle but does not mention the loss of an important flag. In fact, the entire letter gives the impression that the lost battle was of limited importance. In 1598, Neocorus wrote that the banner captured in 1500 was brought to the church in Wöhrden and hung there for the next 59 years until it was returned to the Danes as part of the peace settlement in 1559.

Modern period 

Used as a maritime flag since the 16th century, the Dannebrog was introduced as a regimental flag in the Danish army in 1785, and for the militia (landeværn) in 1801. From 1842, it was used as the flag of the entire army.

During the first half of the 19th century, in parallel to the development of Romantic nationalism in other European countries, the military flag increasingly came to be seen as representing the nation itself. Poems of this period invoking the Dannebrog were written by B.S. Ingemann, N.F.S. Grundtvig, Oehlenschläger, Chr. Winther and H.C. Andersen. By the 1830s, the military flag had become popular as an unofficial national flag, and its use by private citizens was outlawed in a circular enacted on 7 January 1834.

In the national enthusiasm sparked by the First Schleswig War during 1848–1850, the flag was still very widely displayed, and the prohibition of private use was repealed in a regulation of 7 July 1854, for the first time allowing Danish citizens to display the Dannebrog (but not the swallow-tailed Splitflag variant). Special permission to use the Splitflag was given to individual institutions and private companies, especially after 1870. In 1886, the war ministry introduced a regulation indicating that the flag should be flown from military buildings on thirteen specified days, including royal birthdays, the date of the signing of the Constitution of 5 June 1849 and on days of remembrance for military battles. In 1913, the naval ministry issued its own list of flag days. On 10 April 1915, the hoisting of any other flag on Danish soil was prohibited. From 1939 until 2012, the yearbook Hvem-Hvad-Hvor included a list of flag days. As of 2019 flag days can be viewed at the "Ministry of Justice (Justitsministeriet)" as well as "The Denmark Society (Danmarks-Samfundet)".

Variants

Maritime flag and corresponding Kingdom flag 

The size and shape of the civil ensign ("Koffardiflaget") for merchant ships is given in the regulation of 11 June 1748, which says: A red flag with a white cross with no split end. The white cross must be  of the flag's height. The two first fields must be square in form and the two outer fields must be  lengths of those. The proportions are thus: 3:1:3 vertically and 3:1:4.5 horizontally. This definition are the absolute proportions for the Danish national flag to this day, for both the civil version of the flag ("Stutflaget"), as well as the merchant flag ("Handelsflaget"). The civil flag and the merchant flag are identical in colour and design.

A regulation passed in 1758 required Danish ships sailing in the Mediterranean to carry the royal cypher in the center of the flag in order to distinguish them from Maltese ships, due to the similarity of the flag of the Sovereign Military Order of Malta.

According to the regulation of 11 June 1748 the colour was simply red, which is common known today as "Dannebrog rød" ("Dannebrog red"). The only available red fabric dye in 1748 was made of madder root, which can be processed to produce a brilliant red dye (used historically for British soldiers' jackets). A regulation of 4 May 1927 once again states that Danish merchant ships have to fly flags according to the regulation of 1748.

The first regulation regarding the Splitflag dates from 27 March 1630, in which King Christian IV orders that Norwegian Defensionskibe (armed merchants ships) may only use the Splitflag if they are in Danish war service. In 1685 an order, distributed to a number of cities in Slesvig, states that all ships must carry the Danish flag, and in 1690 all merchant ships are forbidden to use the Splitflag, with the exception of ships sailing in the East Indies, West Indies and along the coast of Africa. In 1741 it is confirmed that the regulation of 1690 is still very much in effect; that merchant ships may not use the Splitflag. At the same time the Danish East India Company is allowed to fly the Splitflag when past the equator.

Some confusion must have existed regarding the Splitflag. In 1696 the Admiralty presented the King with a proposal for a standard regulating both size and shape of the Splitflag. In the same year a royal resolution defines the proportions of the Splitflag, which in this resolution is called Kongeflaget (the King's flag), as follows: The cross must be  of the flags height. The two first fields must be square in form with the sides three times the cross width. The two outer fields are rectangular and  the length of the square fields. The tails are the length of the flag.

These numbers are the basic for the Splitflag, or Orlogsflag, today, though the numbers have been slightly altered. The term Orlogsflag dates from 1806 and denotes use in the Danish Navy.

From about 1750 to the early 19th century, a number of ships and companies which the government has interests in, received approval to use the Splitflag.

In the royal resolution of 25 October 1939 for the Danish Navy, it is stated that the Orlogsflag is a Splitflag with a deep red ("dybrød") or madder red ("kraprød") colour. Like the National flag, no nuance is given, but in modern days this is given as 195U. Furthermore, the size and shape is corrected in this resolution to be: "The cross must be  of the flag's height. The two outer fields are rectangular and  the length of the square fields. The tails are  the length of the rectangular fields". Thus, if compared to the standard of 1696, both the rectangular fields and the tails have decreased in size.

The Splitflag and Orlogsflag have similar shapes but different sizes and shades of red. Legally, they are two different flags. The Splitflag is a Danish flag ending in a swallow-tail, it is Dannebrog red, and is used on land. The Orlogsflag is an elongated Splitflag with a deeper red colour and is only used on sea.

The Orlogsflag with no markings, may only be used by the Royal Danish Navy. There are though a few exceptions to this. A few institutions have been allowed to fly the clean Orlogsflag. The same flag with markings has been approved for a few dozen companies and institutions over the years.

Furthermore, the Orlogsflag is only described as such if it has no additional markings. Any swallow-tail flag, no matter the colour, is called a Splitflag provided it bears additional markings.

Royal standards 

Monarch
The current version of the royal standard was introduced on 16 November 1972 when the Queen adopted a new version of her personal coat of arms. The royal standard is the flag of Denmark with a swallow-tail and charged with the monarch's coat of arms set in a white square. The centre square is 32 parts in a flag with the ratio 56:107.

Other members of the royal family

Other flags in the Kingdom of Denmark 
Greenland and the Faroe Islands are autonomous territories within the Kingdom of Denmark. They have their own official flags.

Some areas in Denmark have unofficial flags. While they have no legal recognition or regulation, they can be used freely.

The regional flags of Bornholm and Ærø are occasionally used by locals of those islands and in tourist-related businesses. 

The proposal for a flag of Jutland has hardly found any actual use, maybe in part due to its peculiar design. 

The flag of Vendsyssel (Vendelbrog) is seen infrequently, but many locals recognise it. According to an article in the newspaper Nordjyske, the flag had been used in the former insignia of Flight Eskadrille 723 of Aalborg Air Base, in the 1980s.

See also 

Flag of Greenland
Flag of the Faroe Islands
List of Danish flags
Nordic Cross flag
Raven banner
Flag of the Sovereign Military Order of Malta
Flag of Savoy
Danish Protest Pig, a breed of pig bred to look like the Danish flag.

References

General references

 Danmarks-Samfundet – several rules and customs about the use of Dannebrog
 Dannebrog, Helga Bruhn, Forlaget Jespersen og Pios, Copenhagen 1949
 Danebrog – Danmarks Palladium, E. D. Lund, Forlaget H. Hagerups, Copenhagen 1919
 Dannebrog – Vort Flag, Lieutenant Colonel Thaulow, Forlaget Codan, Copenhagen 1943
 DS 359:2005 'Flagdug', Dansk Standard, 2005

External links 

 
 Danish flag legendary birthplace in Estonia 

National symbols of Denmark
Denmark
 
Denmark
Denmark
Articles containing video clips